Harry Waites, sometimes also called Jim Waites, was an English football coach active in the Netherlands in the 1920s.

Career
Waites, who was a rugby player in his youth, spent World War I in an open Prisoner-of-War camp in the Netherlands, alongside footballer Arnold Birch. After the war ended in 1918, Waites became a coach of Be Quick, winning the league title in 1920. Waites managed the Dutch national side in 1921, and later managed Dutch club side Feyenoord between 1924 and 1925, before returning to England.

References

Year of birth missing
Year of death missing
English football managers
Be Quick 1887 managers
Netherlands national football team managers
Feyenoord managers
British Army personnel of World War I
English expatriate football managers